The Polish Academy Award for Best Supporting Actor is an annual award given to the best Polish supporting actor of the year.

Winners and nominees

Multiple awards and nominations

References

External links
 Polish Film Awards; Official website

Film awards for supporting actor
Polish film awards
Awards established in 2000